The Los Brazos Historic District in Los Ojos, New Mexico is a historic district which was listed on the National Register of Historic Places in 1985.

(#85000827)	Roughly bounded by U.S. Route 84, North Rd., fence line and drop-off to Rio Brazos
Architecture: Folk Territorial
Historic subfunction: Single Dwelling; Agricultural Outbuildings; Secondary Structure
Criteria: architecture/engineering, architecture/engineering

References

National Register of Historic Places in Rio Arriba County, New Mexico
Historic districts on the National Register of Historic Places in New Mexico